ULT may refer to:

 the Latin abbreviation ult., previously used especially in business correspondence for ultimo mense, (last month)
 Sauer S 2100 ULT, a turbocharged four-stroke aircraft engine for homebuilt and ultralight aircraft
 ULT freezer, an ultra low temperature freezer
 United Learning Trust, a UK educational charity
 United Lodge of Theosophists
 "ULT", a song by Denzel Curry from the 2016 album Imperial
 ULT-160, a front loader that was produced Serbian heavy machinery manufacturer 14. oktobar from 1985
 Ult Tagdyry, a Kazakh nationalist political movement
 Tunisia Private University (Université Libre de Tunis, ULT)

See also
 Ultimo (disambiguation)
 Ultra (disambiguation)
 UTL (disambiguation)